Kjetil Tvedte Grutle, better known as Grutle Kjellson (born 24 December 1973 in Sveio, Hordaland, Norway), is the bassist and vocalist of the Norwegian progressive black metal band Enslaved. Together with Ivar Bjørnson, they are the founding and the only constant members, as well as the main songwriters of the band.

Biography 
In 1989, aged 17, Grutle and his 13-year-old friend, guitarist Ivar Bjørnson and other musicians, founded death metal band Phobia, but they left the project in mid-1991. At that time, both and drummer Trym Torson decided to form a band inspired by Norse mythology called Enslaved, in Haugesund. Kjellson and Bjørnson are the only permanent members of Enslaved since its inception to date.

In 1996, Grutle together with Ivar, Infernus and Tormentor created the short-lived thrash metal band Desekrator, disbanded in 1999. In 2005, Grutle along with Ivar, Arve Isdal and other musicians created Trinacria.

Grutle has a guest performance on the song "High on Cold War" on Darkthrone's 2006 EP, Too Old, Too Cold.

He also contributed, along with his Enslaved colleagues Arve Isdal and Herbrand Larsen and American actress Laraine Newman, in the animated television series  Metalocalypse  as one of "The Klokateers" in 2009. He also participated in the documentaries Showman (2010) and Metal Evolution (2014), as himself.

Controversies 
Kjellson is known to be openly anti-Christian and non-religious, but not Satanist. He stated in multiple interviews, including in the Canadian documentary film Metal: A Headbanger's Journey (2005), his opinion on the '90s church burnings in Norway. In one interview, he said: 
Well in a way, I think that Christianity in Norway deserved it, you know? In the beginning, it was not something the Norwegians chose. It was forced upon them. So you can say that "That's a thousand years ago", but — I wasn't sad, I wasn't really happy either — but I mean, in a historical point of view Christianity deserved it.
He’s also known to be a Norse pagan.

Discography

Enslaved 
 Vikingligr Veldi (1994)
 Frost (1994)
 Eld (1997)
 Blodhemn (1998)
 Mardraum – Beyond the Within (2000)
 Monumension (2001)
 Below the Lights (2003)
 Isa (2004)
 Ruun (2006)
 Vertebrae (2008)
 Axioma Ethica Odini (2010)
 RIITIIR (2012)
 In Times (2015)
 E (2017)
 Utgard (2020)
 Caravans to the Outer Worlds (2021)
 Heimdal (2023)

Desekrator 
Desekrator	(Demo,1997)	 
Metal for Demons (1998)

Darkthrone 
 Too Old, Too Cold (2006)

V:28 
 NonAnthropogenic (2003)

Vreid 
I Krig (2007)

Trinacria 
Travel Now Journey Infinitely (2008)

References

External links 
 Enslaved's official website
 Grutle Kjellson's official Facebook page

Norwegian black metal musicians
Norwegian rock guitarists
Norwegian heavy metal guitarists
Norwegian multi-instrumentalists
1973 births
Living people
Place of birth missing (living people)
Enslaved (band) members
21st-century Norwegian guitarists
Musicians from Sveio